The water-level task is an experiment in developmental and cognitive psychology developed by Jean Piaget.<ref>The Early Growth of Logic in the Child</u>, Barbel Inhelder & Jean Piaget</ref>

The experiment attempts to assess the subject's reasoning ability in spatial relations. To do so the subject is shown pictures depicting various shaped bottles with a water level marked, then shown pictures of the bottles tilted on different angles without the level marked, and the subject is asked to mark where the water level would be.

Sex differences in performance
The water level task has been of interest to psychologists due to puzzling sex differences in performance of the task. Multiple studies have indicated that female participants fail the task at a significantly higher rate than male participants.

References

Psychology experiments